Mikel Pagola Biurrun (born 4 March 1982) is a Spanish footballer who plays as a goalkeeper.

Apart from 18 months with Salamanca in Segunda División, he spent the vast majority of his career in Segunda División B, where he made over 450 appearances in service of 11 teams.

Club career
Born in Pamplona, Navarre, Pagola began his senior career with CD Oberena in Tercera División and joined Segunda División B team CA Osasuna B in 2001, also having a season on loan at SD Ponferradina before switching to Burgos CF in 2004; he continued competing in the latter level in the following years, being relegated with CD Móstoles in 2005–06.

Pagola earned his first transfer to a professional club, UD Salamanca of Segunda División, in the summer of 2007. He made the first of his 18 competitive appearances for the Castile and León side on 5 September, in a 1–2 home loss against Elche CF in the second round of the Copa del Rey. On 19 January 2008, having fallen to third-choice behind Alberto and Biel Ribas, he terminated his contract and returned to division three with Ponferradina.

After again being featured sparingly at the Estadio El Toralín, Pagola represented in quick succession and always in the third tier Deportivo Alavés, CD Badajoz, Real Balompédica Linense, CD El Palo and CD Tudelano. With the latter, for whom he signed in 2014, he had good form in the second half of the 2015–16 campaign, beating José Manuel Domínguez Vilches' clean sheet record of 976 minutes without conceding a goal in the competition and eventually Abel Resino's of 1,275 across all Spanish football, racking up 1,342 before letting in the only goal of a home defeat to Hércules CF in the promotion play-offs.

References

External links

1982 births
Living people
Spanish footballers
Footballers from Pamplona
Association football goalkeepers
Segunda División players
Segunda División B players
CD Oberena players
CA Osasuna B players
SD Ponferradina players
Burgos CF footballers
CF Badalona players
CD Móstoles footballers
CD Guijuelo footballers
UD Salamanca players
Deportivo Alavés players
CD Badajoz players
Real Balompédica Linense footballers
CD El Palo players
CD Tudelano footballers